The 2003–04 Serie C1 was the twenty-sixth edition of Serie C1, the third highest league in the Italian football league system.

League standings

Serie C1/A

Play-off

Semifinal

|-
| style="background:#eee" colspan=4 |
|-

Final

Play-out

|-
| style="background:#eee" colspan=4 |
|-

Final Verdict
Arezzo and Cesena promoted to Serie B

Varese, Pavia and Prato relegated to Serie C2

Repechage : Pavia and Prato admitted at Serie C1 2004–05

Serie C1/B

Play-off

Semifinal

|-
| style="background:#eee" colspan=4 |
|-

Final

Play-out

|-
| style="background:#eee" colspan=4 |
|-

Final Verdict
Catanzaro and Crotone promoted to Serie B

L'Aquila, Paternò, Taranto and Viterbese relegated to Serie C2

Team failed
Varese,
L'Aquila,
Paternò,
Viterbese

External links
Italy 2003/04 at RSSSF

Serie C1 seasons
Italy
3